Reading Junior Senior High School is a public high school in Reading, Ohio, United States. It is the only public high school in the Reading Community City School District.

Athletics 
Reading teams are known as the Blue Devils. The Blue Devils are a long time member of the Cincinnati Hills League. The Devils share a deep rivalry with neighboring High School Deer Park.

Ohio High School Athletic Association State Championships

 Boys baseball – 1942, 1944, 1946, 1957, 1974, 1980 
 Boys basketball – 2003 
 Boys golf – 1949

Notable alumni 
Claude Osteen- Former Major League Baseball pitcher who played 18 seasons mostly with the Los Angeles Dodgers.
Brian O'Connor (pitcher)- Pittsburgh Pirates pitcher
Tony Pike- Former UC Quarterback. Former member of the Carolina Panthers of the NFL. 
DeShawn Wynn- Former University of Florida Running Back.  Member of the 2006 National Champion Gator Football Team.
Darrell Pace- 1976 and 1984 Olympic Gold Medalist- Archery
Steve Engel- Former MLB player (Chicago Cubs)
Daniel Von Bargen - Actor (featured in Seinfeld, Super Troopers and Malcolm in the Middle)

References

External links
 District Website

High schools in Hamilton County, Ohio
Public high schools in Ohio